S Ramachandra Reddy (6 September 1944-2005) was an Indian politician from Penukonda, Anantapur district. He belonged to the Kuruba caste.

Political life 
In 1983, he contested from Penukonda and won as MLA by defeating Gangula Narayana Reddy. Later in 1985 he contested from Telugu Desam party and won by defeating G Veeranna of the Congress Party. This time he became Minister in N. T. Rama Rao's government. He served as minister for Industry and Ports and Chairman of Backward Classes Welfare Committee. But he lost to S Chenna Reddy in the 1989 elections. In 1996 he won as MP from Hindupur (Lok Sabha constituency) by defeating S. Gangadhar, with a 172,422 vote majority. In 1998 he was defeated by S. Gangadhar.

References

India MPs 1996–1997
People from Anantapur district
Telugu Desam Party politicians
Andhra Pradesh MLAs 1983–1985
Andhra Pradesh MLAs 1985–1989
People from Rayalaseema
1944 births
2005 deaths